Evening Songs is an album collection of arrangements for cello and piano of songs by Frederick Delius and John Ireland containing three world premiere recordings. The album was recorded by the cellist Julian Lloyd Webber in September 2011 for Naxos.

Track listing
 Sunset by Frederick Delius
 Spring Sorrow  by John Ireland
 Birds in the High Hall Garden  by Frederick Delius - world premiere recording
 Evening Song by John Ireland - world premiere recording
 In the Seraglio Garden by Frederick Delius
 Love’s Philosophy  by Frederick Delius
 Sea-Fever by John Ireland
 Over the Mountains High by Frederick Delius
 The Holy Boy by John Ireland
 Serenade from Hassan by Frederick Delius
 Through Long Long Years by Frederick Delius
 Baby by John Ireland
 The Three Ravens by John Ireland
 Little Birdie by Frederick Delius
 Hope by John Ireland
 Ladslove by John Ireland
 Slumber Song by Frederick Delius
 Summer Schemes by John Ireland
 With Your Blue Eyes by Frederick Delius
 Her Song by John Ireland
 In Summer Woods by John Ireland - world premiere recording

Personnel
 Julian Lloyd Webber, Cello
 Jiaxin Cheng, cello
 John Lenehan, Piano

References

External links
 Julian Lloyd Webber's website
 Evening Songs album reviews
 - excerpt from the title track of the album
 Delius Society  website
 John Ireland Trust
 Independent Newspaper podcast
 Gramophone Magazine podcast

2011 classical albums
Julian Lloyd Webber albums